The 2022 Northeast Conference women's basketball tournament was the postseason basketball tournament for the Northeast Conference for the 2021–22 NCAA Division I women's basketball season. The tournament took place March 5, 7, 10, and 13, 2022 and all tournament games were played on home arenas of the higher-seeded school. The tournament winner received an automatic bid to the NCAA tournament.

Seeds 
All nine of the eligible ten teams in the conference qualified for the tournament. Teams were seeded by record within the conference, with a tiebreaker system to seed teams with identical conference records.

The tiebreakers used by the NEC are 1) head-to-head records of teams with identical records, 2) comparison of records against individual teams in the conference starting with the top-ranked team(s) and working down and 3) NCAA NET Rankings available on day following the conclusion of Northeast Conference regular-season play.

 Note: Merrimack College joined the Northeast Conference from Division II Northeast-10 Conference. The Warriors will not be eligible for the NEC Tournament until 2024.

Schedule

Bracket 

* denotes overtime period.

References 

2021–22 Northeast Conference women's basketball season
Northeast Conference women's basketball tournament
Northeast Conference men's basketball tournament